Springcreek may refer to -

Places
Springcreek Township, Miami County, Ohio

Ships
, a British coaster in service 1948-51